Grand Katende hydroelectric power station (4 x 16 MW) is a hydropower plant under construction in the Democratic Republic of the Congo, with installed capacity of . When completed, it will be operated by the Congolese electricity utility company, Société Nationale d'Électricité (SNEL).

Location
The power station is located on eastern bank of the Lulua River, a tributary of the Congo River, in Kasaï-Central Province, in south-central DR Congo, close to the border with Angola. The geographical coordinates of Katende Hydroelectric Power Station are: 06°20'48.0"S, 22°27'02.0"E (Latitude:-6.346667; Longitude:22.450556).

Overview
LoC of US$ 168 million for the Katende Hydro power Project (64 MW), in the Kasai Occidental Province, was signed on July 11, 2011 and the contract awarded to a consortium on 18th August, 2011 to the Indian company BHEL-AIL Consortium, began construction of the Katende Hydroelectric Power Station, at a contract price of US$280 million. The energy project was intended to supply power to Kananga, Mbuji-Mai and neighboring communities, with initial completion date of 2016. WAPCOS Limited is project management consultant for this project. Ministry of Energy and Water Resources (MOEWR), D R Congo is Owner of the project.

Delay
The Kamwina Nsapu rebellion broke out in August 2016. Sometime in 2017, the contractor stopped work and vacated the construction site. At that time, civil engineering work was 55 percent complete. In early 2021, the government of the Democratic Republic of the Congo began negotiations with the Indian government to restart construction of the dam and associated projects. Selection of a new contractor is under process.

Associated projects
In addition to Katende HPP, the contractor was expected to construct three high voltage evacuation lines. Agreement for a LOC of US$ 109.942 million for Transmission and Distribution Line Project for the evacuation of power from the Katende Hydropower Project was signed on 28th May, 2015.

See also

References

External links
DR Congo: Kinshasa to restart work on the Katende hydroelectric dam (64 MW) As of 24 February 2021.
Democratic Republic of Congo and GE sign energy infrastructure agreement As of 13 February 2020. 

Hydroelectric power stations in the Democratic Republic of the Congo
Kasaï-Central
Hydroelectricity in the Democratic Republic of the Congo
Dams in the Democratic Republic of the Congo